A distelfink is a stylized goldfinch, probably based on the European variety.  It frequently appears in Pennsylvania Dutch folk art.  It represents happiness and good fortune and the Pennsylvania German people, and is a common theme in hex signs and in fraktur.  The word distelfink (literally 'thistle-finch') is (besides Stieglitz) the German name for the European goldfinch.

In popular culture

In the story "The Sign of the Triple Distelfink", the American cartoonist Don Rosa used a triple distelfink hex sign as the origin for Gladstone Gander's remarkable luck.

Notes

External links
Example of a distelfink

American art
Visual motifs